Tsholola Tshinyama (born 12 December 1980), commonly known as Tiko, is a Congolese footballer who last played for Belgian Pro League club Lokeren as a midfielder in 2013. As of the summer of 2013, he is a free agent player.

Tshinyama started his career at Congolese side Saint-Luc before moving to TP Mazembe. In 2003, he signed for the South African team Ajax Cape Town and went on to make more than 60 appearances for the side. Despite playing primarily as a defensive midfielder Tshinyama also scored on several occasions for them.

In June 2007 it was announced that Tshinyama had signed a four-year contract with SC Lokeren where he will join up with international teammates Marcel Mbayo and Patiyo Tambwe.

Clubs 
 SC Lokeren (Belgium) (2007-)
 Ajax Cape Town (South Africa) (2003–2007)
 Tout Puissant Mazembe (Democratic Republic of Congo) (2001–2002)
 AS Saint-Luc (Democratic Republic of Congo) (2000)

Honours
Lokeren
Belgian Cup: 2011–12

References

External links

1980 births
Living people
Footballers from Kinshasa
Democratic Republic of the Congo footballers
Democratic Republic of the Congo international footballers
Democratic Republic of the Congo expatriate footballers
K.S.C. Lokeren Oost-Vlaanderen players
Belgian Pro League players
Association football midfielders
TP Mazembe players
Cape Town Spurs F.C. players
Expatriate soccer players in South Africa
Expatriate footballers in Belgium
Democratic Republic of the Congo expatriate sportspeople in South Africa
Democratic Republic of the Congo expatriate sportspeople in Belgium